Aaron Addo Dankwah (born 6 January 1993) is a Ghanaian football player.

Career 
He played for Swiss side Lugano, in their academy team Team Ticino U-21, before joined to Kaposvári Rákóczi FC on loan in February 2012. Addo returned in May 2012 to FC Lugano and was than released in December 2012. After his releasing by the Swiss club of Lugano returned on permanently basis to Kaposvári Rákóczi FC. He played in twelve months 18 games for Kaposvári in the Nemzeti Bajnokság, before the club resigned his contract

References

External links

1993 births
Living people
Ghanaian footballers
Association football midfielders
FC Lugano players
Kaposvári Rákóczi FC players
Nemzeti Bajnokság I players
Ghanaian expatriate footballers
Expatriate footballers in Switzerland
Expatriate footballers in Hungary
Ghanaian expatriate sportspeople in Switzerland
Ghanaian expatriate sportspeople in Hungary